Eric Poe Xing is an American computer scientist, academic administrator, and entrepreneur. Prior to his appointment as President of MBZUAI, Xing was a professor in the School of Computer Science at Carnegie Mellon University and researcher in machine learning, computational biology, and statistical methodology. Xing is also the Founder, Chairman, Chief Scientist, and former CEO of Petuum Inc.

Xing became president of MBZUAI in January 2021.

Biography
Xing received a B.Sc. in physics at Tsinghua University in 1993, and a Ph.D. in molecular biology at Rutgers University in 1999 and a Ph.D. in computer science at the University of California, Berkeley in 2004.

Xing became a faculty member at Carnegie Mellon University in 2004, directing the SAILING Lab whose research spans a broad spectrum of topics ranging from theoretical foundations to real-world applications in machine learning, distributed systems, computer vision, natural language processing, and computational biology. He became a tenured professor in 2011 and became a full professor in 2014.

In 2010, Xing served as a visiting research professor at Meta, formerly known as Facebook, as well as a visiting professor at Stanford University’s Department of Statistics.

Xing is a board member of the International Machine Learning Society. Starting in 2014 he served as the program chair and in 2019 began duties as general chair of the International Conference of Machine Learning (ICML).

In 2016, Xing co-founded Petuum Inc., a US-based startup dedicated to democratizing the ownership and use of AI systems and solutions and make even the most advanced AI technology accessible and affordable. In 2016 and 2017, Petuum was named by CB Insight as one of the AI 100 around the world. In 2017, Petuum raised $93 million in a round of venture funding from SoftBank. With his collaborators, Xing developed the Petuum framework for distributed machine learning with massive data, big models, and a wide spectrum of algorithms.

In January 2021, Xing became President of the Mohamed bin Zayed University of Artificial Intelligence (MBZUAI), a graduate, research university focused on AI, computer science, and digital technologies across industrial sectors.

Honors and awards
Xing is a recipient of the National Science Foundation (NSF) Career Award, the Alfred P. Sloan Research Fellowship, the United States Air Force Office of Scientific Research Young Investigator Award, the IBM Open Collaborative Research Faculty Award, the Carnegie Science Award, as well as several best paper and dissertation awards in leading CS and AI conferences including OSDI, NeurIPS, KDD, ACL, ISMB.

In 2016, he was elected a Fellow of the Association of Advancement of Artificial Intelligence (AAAI). In 2019, he was elected a Fellow of the Institute of Electrical and Electronic Engineers (IEEE) for "contributions to machine learning algorithms and systems." In 2022 he was named as a Fellow of the American Statistical Association and an ACM Fellow.

See also
Probabilistic graphical model

References

External links
Eric Xing (at Carnegie Mellon University )

Living people
Artificial intelligence researchers
Machine learning researchers
Carnegie Mellon University faculty
Rutgers University alumni
Tsinghua University alumni
UC Berkeley College of Engineering alumni
Fellows of the Association for the Advancement of Artificial Intelligence
Fellows of the American Statistical Association
Fellows of the Association for Computing Machinery
Year of birth missing (living people)